Beat'n Down Yo Block! is the debut album from Atlanta-based rapper Unk. It was released October 3, 2006.
Beat'n Down Yo Block! features many prominent southern rappers, among them D.G. Yola, Baby D and Dem Franchize Boyz. It also features production by Jazze Pha.

Koch Records re-released an expanded edition of the album on September 25, 2007, featuring previously unreleased tracks and a bonus DVD.

Critical reception

AllMusic's David Jeffries said that despite the over-bloated track list containing "redundant filler", he praised Unk's delivery and catchy rhymes and Big Oomp overseeing the record, concluding that: "Seeing how Beat'n Down Yo Block is such a loud, hedonistic, and thuggish good time, that's a fair tradeoff." Steve Juon of RapReviews criticized the track list for following a formula that uses the "same tempo, same bassline, same monotonous rap about the same topics" and felt that Unk did little to distinguish himself alongside fellow Southern rappers Young Jeezy and Yung Joc.

Track listing
"Intro" (feat. Jelly) (Platt, Anthony/Shahid, Fard) — 1:53
"Beat'n Down Yo Block" (Humphrey, Montay/Platt, Anthony) — 3:42
"Walk It Out" (Humphrey, Montay/Platt, Anthony/Simmons, Howard) — 2:53
"Comin' Down Da Street" (feat. Loko) (Humphrey, Montay/Platt, Anthony/Scott, Lorenzo) — 2:47
"Bring It Back" (Humphrey, Montay/Platt, Anthony) — 3:29
"2 Step" (Humphrey, Montay/Platt, Anthony/Shahid, Fard) — 3:15
"Slow It Up" (feat. Jizzal Man) (Humphrey, Montay/Leverette, Benard/Platt, Anthony) — 2:55
"Don't Make Us" (feat. DJ Montay & D.G. Yola) (Humphrey, Montay/Platt, Anthony/Simmons, Howard/Talley, Mario) — 5:21
"Flatline" (Humphrey, Montay/Platt, Anthony) — 2:56
"Thinking Of You" (feat. Jazze Pha) (Alexander, P./Hooker, Corey/Platt, Anthony/Shahid, Fard) — 3:27
"Fresh Dressed" (feat. Backbone) (Humphrey, Montay/Platt, Anthony/Williams, Jamahr) — 4:51
"Ayyy" (Platt, Anthony) — 3:21
"This Is How We Do" (feat. Big Korey & Dru) (Matey, Andrew/Platt, Anthony/Roberson, Korey) — 2:51
"Hold On Ho" (feat. Baby D, DJ Montay & Parlae) (Platt, Anthony/Simmons, Howard/Jenkins, Donald/Gleaton, Maurice) — 3:23
"Smokin' Sticky Sticky" (Humphrey, Montay/Platt, Anthony) — 6:20
"Hit the Dance Floor" (feat. Baby D) (Platt, Anthony) — 3:38
"Say Yes" (feat. Dru) (Matey, Andrew/Platt, Anthony/Scott, Lorenzo/Shahid, Fard) — 2:33
"Back It Up" (Platt, Anthony/Simmons, Howard) — 2:26
"Brand New Day" (Platt, Andrew/Scott, Lorenzo) — 5:06

Deluxe Edition
In addition to the tracks mentioned on the original album, the following tracks were added: (iTunes Music Store version)
"Walk It Out (Remix)" (featuring OutKast and Jim Jones)
"2 Step (Remix)" (featuring T-Pain, Jim Jones and E-40)
"Hit the Dance Floor" (Music Video)
"Walk It Out" (Music Video)
"2 Step" (Music Video)

Charts

Weekly charts

References

Unk albums
2006 debut albums
E1 Music albums